The 1899 St Pancras East by-election was held on 12 July 1899 following the resignation of the incumbent Conservative MP, Robert Grant Webster in order to return to legal work. Webster vacated his Parliamentary seat by being appointed Steward of the Chiltern Hundreds on 1 July 1899.

Candidates
The Conservative Party candidate was Thomas Wrightson who had been MP for Stockton from 1892 to 1895.

The Liberal Party candidate was Benjamin Francis Conn Costelloe. Costelloe was the London County Council member for Bethnal Green South West. He had previously served on the council for Stepney and Chelsea, and had contested this constituency at the previous general election.

Result

References

St Pancras East by-election
St Pancras East,1899 
1899 in England
1899 in London
St Pancras East,1899